Seymour Melman (December 30, 1917 – December 16, 2004) was an American professor emeritus of industrial engineering and operations research at Columbia University's Fu Foundation School of Engineering and Applied Science.

He wrote extensively for fifty years on "economic conversion", the ordered transition from military to civilian production by military industries and facilities. Author of The Permanent War Economy and Pentagon Capitalism, he was an economist, writer, and gadfly of the military-industrial complex.

Biography 

Seymour Melman was born in New York City on December 30, 1917.  He studied at the De Witt Clinton High School in the Bronx and received his undergraduate degree from the City College of New York in 1939. After graduation he received a travel fellowship and traveled to Palestine and Europe between 1939 and 1940.

Upon returning to the United States he served for two years as the secretary of the Student Zionist Federation.  Soon after the attack on Pearl Harbor, he served in the US Army as a First Lieutenant in the Coast Artillery Corps.  Afterwards he served on the National Industrial Conference Board. He became a graduate student at Columbia University in January 1945 and received his Ph.D. in economics in June 1949. He joined the Columbia faculty that year and was a popular instructor until he retired from teaching in 2003.

Melman was the former President of the Association for Evolutionary Economics, Vice President of the New York Academy of Sciences, co-chair of SANE (Committee for a Sane Nuclear Policy), chair of The National Commission for Economic Conversion and Disarmament, and a participant in the Reindustrialization of the United States Project.

In 1976 SANE's New York City conference on "The Arms Race and the Economic Crisis" featured Melman, and won an economic conversion plank in the Democratic party platform.

Melman died in his Manhattan home of an aneurysm on December 16, 2004.

Work 
Melman was part of a circle of intellectuals with epicenters in various networks. He was associated with the Frame of Reference group led by University of Pennsylvania Professor Zellig Harris, which culminated in Harris's posthumous book The transformation of capitalist society. He also fraternized with a group of scholars at Columbia University that included the sociologist Robert S. Lynd. And he was connected to a wide network of national and international scholars and activists concerned with disarmament, economic conversion and economic democracy, including Noam Chomsky, Marcus Raskin, Harley Shaiken, John Ullmann, Lloyd J. Dumas, and John Kenneth Galbraith, among many others.

He was also on the advisory board of FFIPP-USA (Faculty for Israeli-Palestinian Peace-USA), a network of Palestinian, Israeli, and International faculty, and students, working in for an end of the Israeli occupation of Palestinian territories and a just peace. 

The legacy of Seymour Melman's work continues in a fellowship and research program supported by the Institute for Policy Studies in Washington, D.C. and through the work of his former colleagues in the Economic Reconstruction network.

Quotations
"The joy of accomplishing production. It's a great thing. The work I've been doing now for some time is writing an article, writing a book, or researching something. It's an accomplishment. It's a great thing. No, more exactly, it's living. It's being alive. To be productive is to be alive."

"A bomb equivalent to 20 million tons of TNT would cause an intense fire called a 'fire storm' in an area about  around the area of the blast.  And in such an area it would be futile, desperately futile to construct what are called 'fallout shelters'".

Publications 
 1956. Dynamic factors in industrial productivity. New York, Wiley.
 1958. Decision Making and Productivity.
 1958. Inspection for Disarmament. Editor.
 1961. The Peace Race.
 1962. No Place to Hide Fallout Shelters-Fact and Fiction. Editor.
 1962. Disarmament; Its Politics And Economics. Editor.
 1965. Our Depleted Society
 1968. In the name of America; the conduct of the war in Vietnam by the armed forces of the United States as shown by published reports, compared with the laws of war binding on the United States Government and on its citizens. With Melvyn Baron and Dodge Ely. New York : Clergy.
 1970. The defense economy; conversion of industries and occupations to civilian needs. New York:  Praeger.
 1970. Pentagon Capitalism: The Political Economy of War. New York: McGraw-Hill.
 1971. The war economy of the United States; readings on military industry and economy. New York:  St. Martin's Press.
 1983. Profits without Production.
 1985. The Permanent War Economy: American Capitalism in Decline NY: Simon & Schuster.
 1988. The Demilitarized Society: Disarmament & Conversion. Montreal: Harvest House.
 1992. Rebuilding America: A New Economic Plan for the 1990s. Westfield NJ: Open Media.
 2001. After Capitalism: From Managerialism to Workplace Democracy. New York : Knopf.

See also
 Military-industrial complex

References

Further reading 
 "The Economics of War and Peace (Interview with Seymour Melman.)" Village Voice, April 26, 1983
 Robert F. Barsky, Noam Chomsky: A Life of Dissent, Cambridge, MIT Press, 1997.  This book provides some historical background on Zellig Harris, a key mentor to Seymour Melman.
 Jonathan M. Feldman, "From Warfare State to "Shadow State": MILITARISM, ECONOMIC DEPLETION, AND RECONSTRUCTION, Social Text, 25:143-168. This article explains part of Melman's trajectory as part of a cycle of Columbia University-based intellectuals concerned with militarism and demilitarization.(See:  and

External links
MBEAW Seymour Melman Monterey Bay Educators Against War
Warning against Menachem Begin, 1948
Seymour Melman includes numerous articles.
In the Grip of a Permanent War Economy by Seymour Melman from Bear Left!
Seymour Melman Papers 1958-1999 at Columbia
Revival of Manufacturing Sought by Columbia's Industry Expert, Seymour Melman By Suzanne Trimel.  Includes Video Interview and photo
"Ralph Nader on Seymour Melman" by Ralph Nader, 20 December 2004 after Melman's death.
http://www.economicreconstruction.org Website of former colleagues of Seymour Melman
http://www.seymourmelman.com Melman article archive
 Article on After Capitalism
 Seymour Melman talk with Studs Terkel on WFMT
 

Economists from New York (state)
Engineers from New York City
American economics writers
American male non-fiction writers
20th-century American non-fiction writers
American operations researchers
American anti-war activists
American anti–nuclear weapons activists
Columbia University faculty
1917 births
2004 deaths
DeWitt Clinton High School alumni
City College of New York alumni
20th-century American engineers
20th-century American economists
20th-century American male writers